John Franchi (born July 16, 1982) is a retired American mixed martial artist. He previously competed in WEC's  featherweight division.

Background
Franchi was a standout wrestler at Edison High School. He then went on to graduate from the State University of New York at Cortland where he earned a B.A. in Liberal Arts.

MMA
His debut for WEC was a split-decision-win over Mike Budnik at WEC 39.  He lost a unanimous decision to Manny Gamburyan at WEC 41.  

Franchi was defeated by Cub Swanson on November 18, 2009 at WEC 44 in a bout which won Fight of the Night honors.

Championships and accomplishments
World Extreme Cagefighting
Fight of the Night (One time) vs. Cub Swanson

Mixed martial arts record

|-
|Win
|align=center|6–2
|Matt McCook
|Decision (split)
|RW 10: Mayhem in the Mist 5
|
|align=center|3
|align=center|5:00
|Niagara Falls, New York, United States
|
|-
|Loss
|align=center|5–2
|Cub Swanson
|Submission (guillotine choke)
|WEC 44
|
|align=center|3
|align=center|4:50
|Las Vegas, Nevada, United States
|
|-
|Loss
|align=center|5–1
|Manvel Gamburyan
|Decision (unanimous)
|WEC 41
|
|align=center|3
|align=center|5:00
|Sacramento, California, United States
|
|-
|Win
|align=center|5–0
|Mike Budnik
|Decision (split)
|WEC 39
|
|align=center|3
|align=center|5:00
|Corpus Christi, Texas, United States
|
|-
|Win
|align=center|4–0
|Frank Latina
|Submission (rear-naked choke)
|IFL: Connecticut
|
|align=center|1
|align=center|2:19
|Uncasville, Connecticut, United States
|
|-
|Win
|align=center|3–0
|Justin Homsey
|TKO (elbows)
|World Championship Fighting 2
|
|align=center|2
|align=center|0:40
|Wilmington, Massachusetts, United States
|
|-
|Win
|align=center|2–0
|Brian Conrad
|Submission (armbar)
|FFP: Untamed 18
|
|align=center|1
|align=center|2:15
|Plymouth, Massachusetts, United States
|
|-
|Win
|align=center|1–0
|Richard Miner
|TKO 
|EFI: Battle in the Field
|
|align=center|1
|align=center|N/A
|Springfield, Massachusetts, United States
|

Kickboxing Record

|-
|Win
|align=center|1–0
|Keith Nesbitt
| TKO (Fear)
| Gladius Fights 39
|
|align=center|1
|align=center|0:00
|Big Flats, NY, United States
|Nesbitt did not show for weigh-ins.

References

External links 

American male mixed martial artists
Living people
Mixed martial artists from New York (state)
Featherweight mixed martial artists
Mixed martial artists utilizing wrestling
American male sport wrestlers
1982 births